Yuriy Yuriyovych Tkachuk (born 18 April 1995) is a Ukrainian professional footballer who plays as a midfielder for Polish club Znicz Pruszków.

Career
Born in Kelmentsi, Chernivtsi Oblast,  Tkachuk is a product of the Metalist Kharkiv Youth School System. He made his debut for FC Metalist in the match against FC Sevastopol on 7 May 2014 in the Ukrainian Premier League.

On 9 March 2016, Tkachuk signed for Atlético Madrid, being initially assigned to the reserves in Tercera División. On 30 August, he was loaned to Segunda División B side UD Melilla, for one year.

Honours
Atlético Madrid B
Tercera División: 2016–17

Levadia
Estonian Cup: 2017–18
Estonian Supercup: 2018

References

External links
 

 

1995 births
Living people
Ukrainian footballers
Ukrainian expatriate footballers
People from Chernivtsi Oblast
Association football midfielders
Ukraine youth international footballers
Sportspeople from Chernivtsi Oblast
FC Metalist Kharkiv players
Atlético Madrid B players
UD Melilla footballers
FC Karpaty Lviv players
FC Rukh Lviv players
FCI Levadia Tallinn players
FCI Levadia U21 players
FK Ventspils players
FK Liepāja players
Znicz Pruszków players
Latvian Higher League players
Ukrainian First League players
Ukrainian Premier League players
Segunda División B players
Tercera División players
Meistriliiga players
Esiliiga players
III liga players
Ukrainian expatriate sportspeople in Latvia
Ukrainian expatriate sportspeople in Estonia
Ukrainian expatriate sportspeople in Spain
Ukrainian expatriate sportspeople in Poland
Expatriate footballers in Latvia
Expatriate footballers in Estonia
Expatriate footballers in Spain
Expatriate footballers in Poland